This article describes about the squads for the 2022 South American Under-20 Women's Football Championship.

Group A

Chile 
The squad was announced on 25 March 2022.

Head coach: Andrés Castro

Colombia 
The squad was announced on 2 April 2022.

Head coach: Carlos Paniagua

Argentina 
The squad was announced on 31 March 2022.

Head coach: Germán Portanova

Venezuela 
The squad was announced on 3 April 2022.

Head coach: Pamela Conti

Peru 
The squad was announced on 2 April 2022.

Head coach: Conrad Flores

Group B

Brazil 
The squad was announced on 18 March 2022.

Head coach: Jonas Urias

Paraguay 
The squad was announced on 31 March 2022.

Head coach: Daniel Almada

Ecuador 
The squad was announced on 2 April 2022.

Head coach: Eduardo Moscoso

Uruguay 
The squad was announced on 18 March 2022.

Head coach: Ariel Longo

Bolivia 
Head coach: Pablo Cabanillas Palazuelo

References 

South American U-20 Women's Championship